Cristian Daniel Becerine (born 17 April 1977 in Comodoro Rivadavia, Chubut) is an Argentine professional BMX cyclist. He is a 2003 American Bicycle Association champion, a ten-time national BMX riding champion, a silver medalist at the 2004 UCI World Championships in Valkenswaard, Netherlands, and a semifinalist in men's BMX at the 2008 Summer Olympics, representing his nation Argentina. Currently residing in Costa Mesa, California, United States, Becerine also raced for the Free Agent BMX Cycling Team, along with his teammate and two-time defending Olympic champion Māris Štrombergs from Latvia, and the late Kyle Bennett. Becerine currently rides for Throdwn and coaches their development team.

Becerine qualified for the Argentine squad in men's BMX cycling at the 2008 Summer Olympics in Beijing by receiving one of the nation's two available berths based on his top-ten performance from the UCI BMX World Rankings. After he grabbed a twenty-seventh seed on the morning prelims with a time of 37.253 and then finished second in the quarterfinals, Becerine scored a total of 15 placing points to mount a fifth spot in his semifinal heat, narrowly missing out the top-eight final by a single token.

References

External links
 
 
 
 
 
 
 Rider Bio – Free Agent BMX
 

1977 births
Living people
Argentine male cyclists
BMX riders
Olympic cyclists of Argentina
Cyclists at the 2008 Summer Olympics
Pan American Games competitors for Argentina
Cyclists at the 2007 Pan American Games
People from Comodoro Rivadavia